

Films

References

 
2022
2022 in LGBT history
Lists of 2022 films